State Highway 370 (SH 370) is a state highway near Alamosa, Colorado. SH 370's western terminus is at SH 15 near Monte Vista National Wildlife Refuge, and the eastern terminus is at U.S. Route 285 (US 285) south of Alamosa.

Route description
SH 370 runs , starting at a junction with SH 15 near Monte Vista National Wildlife Refuge and ending straight east at a junction with US 285 just south of Alamosa.

Major intersections

References

External links

370
Transportation in Rio Grande County, Colorado
Transportation in Alamosa County, Colorado